Centar (Cyrillic: Центар, lit. ”Center") is a municipality of the city of Sarajevo, Bosnia and Herzegovina. It is located between the older parts of the city under Stari Grad, and the newer more modern parts of the city under the municipalities Novi Grad and Novo Sarajevo.

The Centar municipality, according to the government website, is the administrative, business, commercial, cultural, educational, and medical centre of Sarajevo. Although some of these may be disputed, Centar is certainly the most important part of Sarajevo, housing most major branches of the city and national governments.

The municipality of Centar occupies 3,313 hectrates of land, of which close to 17% is housing. The amount of private and state owned land is nearly equal, with 1600 and 1713 hectrates respectively. The municipality celebrates May 2 as "Centar Municipality Day", in commemoration of the heroic defense by citizens of the aggressor's assault on the Building of the Presidency of Bosnia and Herzegovina. Centar is also home to many Olympic complexes such as Mirza Delibašić Hall and sports venues Asim Ferhatović Hase Stadium and Zetra Olympic Hall.

History
The Siege of Sarajevo had a tremendous effect on Centar. Prior to the aggression, Centar municipality had 79,000 citizens, of which the majority were Bosniaks. 7,000 citizens of the municipality were killed by the aggressors during the war, as major battles took place on its grounds. There was also a heavy presence of land mines in the area, however in December 2003 the government succeeded in clearing all land mines from the area. Since the end of the war, the municipality has received 12 major awards, indicating its current well-being and prosperity.

Demographics

1971
126,598 total
Bosniaks - 74,354 (58.73%)
Serbs - 27,658 (21.84%)
Croats - 12,903 (10.19%)
Yugoslavs - 5,944 (4.69%)
Others - 5,739 (4.55%)

1991
79,286 total
Bosniaks - 39,761 (50.14%)
Serbs - 16,631 (20.97%)
Croats - 5,428 (6.84%)
Yugoslavs - 13,030 (16.43%)
Others - 4,436 (5.62%)

2013
55,181 total
Bosniaks - 41,702 (75.57%)
Croats - 3,333 (6.04%)
Serbs - 2,186 (3.96%)
Others - 7,960 (14.42%)

Communities and neighborhoods

Bardakčije
Betanija - Šip
Breka - Koševo II
Ciglane
Donji Velešići
Džidžikovac - Koševo I
Hrastovi - Mrkovići
Koševsko Brdo
Marijin Dvor
Crni Vrh - Gorica
Mejtaš - Bjelave
MZ Park - Višnjik
Pionirska Dolina – Nahorevo
Skenderija - Podtekija
Soukbunar
Trg Oslobođenja

Gallery

References

Official results from the book: Ethnic composition of Bosnia-Herzegovina population, by municipalities and settlements, 1991. census, Zavod za statistiku Bosne i Hercegovine - Bilten no.234, Sarajevo 1991.

External links

The official web site of Centar municipality Sarajevo

 
Populated places in the Sarajevo Canton